Maharaja Radha Kishore Manikya of the Manikya Dynasty reigned as the king of Tripura State from 1897 to 1909. He has been described as one of the architects of modern Tripura.

Administration
Maharaja Radha Kishore Manikya brought about the separation of Police and Revenue Departments. Before 1905 Police and revenue duties of the state were performed by the Police officers. In 1907, the Raja thoroughly reorganized the Police Department relieving Police from revenue collection. Mr. J.C. Dutta was the first Superintendent of Police appointed by the Raja after such separation.

Patron of the arts and learning
The King had a close relationship with Rabindranath Tagore. Tagore first visited Tripura in 1900 during his reign. The King supported Visva-Bharati University with an annual grant of Rupees 1000. Although in dire financial condition on account of a devastating earthquake the king pledged his daughter in law's jewellery to anonymously sponsor the scientific research of Jagadish Chandra Bose.

Ujjayanta Palace was built by Maharaja Radha Kishore Manikya during 1899–1901 at a cost of 10 lakh (1 million) rupees despite financial constraints. However, as a result of a devastating earthquake in 1897, the palace was destroyed and later rebuilt as Ujjayanta Palace in the heart of Agartala city.

King Radha Kishore Manikya was a patron of learning. He set up the R.K.I.school of Kailashahar besides donating funds towards construction of Victoria college of Comilla in Bangladesh. A full-fledged medical unit in Kolkata's R. G. Kar Medical College and Hospital was set up with financial assistance provided by him.

References

External links
Kingdom of Tripura - University of Queensland The name ujjayanta palace was given by RABINDRANATH TAGORE.
The ujjayanta palace was established in1901.

Kings of Tripura
History of Tripura
People from Agartala